Homochitto is an unincorporated community in Amite County, Mississippi, United States.

History
Homochitto was named after the Homochitto River.

References

Unincorporated communities in Amite County, Mississippi
Unincorporated communities in Mississippi
Mississippi placenames of Native American origin